William McWheeney VC DCM (1830 – 17 May 1866), also known as Mawhinney, was born in Bangor, County Down. He was an Irish recipient of the Victoria Cross, the highest and most prestigious award for gallantry in the face of the enemy that can be awarded to British and Commonwealth forces. He was awarded the VC for his service during the Siege of Sevastopol (1854–1855).

Details
McWheeney was 23 or 24 years old, and a sergeant in the 44th Regiment of Foot (later The Essex Regiment), British Army during the Crimean War when the following deeds took place for which he was awarded the VC:Volunteered as sharpshooter at the commencement of the siege, and was iu  charge of the party of the 44th Regiment; was always vigilant and active, and signalised himself on the 20th October, 1854, when one of his party, Private JohnKeane, 44th Regiment, was dangerously wounded in the Woronzoff Road, at the time the sharpshooters were repulsed from the Quarries by overwhelming numbers. Serjennt M'Wheeney, on his return, took the wounded man on hisback, and brought him to a place of safety. This wasundera  very heavyfire. He was also the means of saving the life of Corporal Courtney. This man was one of the sharpshooters, and was severely wounded in the head, 5th December, 1854. Serjeant M'Wheeney brought him from under fire, and dug up a slight cover with his bayonet, where the two remained until dark, 'when they retired. Serjeant M'Wheeney volunteered for the advanced guard of General Eyre's Brigade, in the Cemetery, on the 18th June, 1855, and was never absent from duty during the war.

Further information
McWheeney died at Dover on 17 May 1866, and was interred there at St James Cemetery, Section R, Number 1-11; his Victoria Cross is displayed at The Essex Regiment Museum (Chelmsford).

References

Publications
Victoria Cross Heroes (Michael Ashcroft, 2006), Headline Book Publishing; /
Monuments to Courage (David Harvey, 1999), Naval Military Press, United States (2008); /
Irish Winners of the Victoria Cross (Richard Doherty & David Truesdale) Four Courts Press Ltd (1 January 2000); /

Crimean War recipients of the Victoria Cross
Irish recipients of the Victoria Cross
British Army personnel of the Crimean War
Recipients of the Distinguished Conduct Medal
Essex Regiment soldiers
People from Bangor, County Down
1830 births
1866 deaths
19th-century Irish people
Irish soldiers in the British Army
British Army personnel of the Second Opium War
British Army recipients of the Victoria Cross
Military personnel from County Down
Burials in Kent